Sean Joseph Cooksey is a Commissioner of the Federal Election Commission.

Education 

Cooksey received his Bachelor of Arts, summa cum laude, from Truman State University and his Juris Doctor from the University of Chicago Law School, where he graduated with High Honors and Order of the Coif, and served as a Managing Editor on the University of Chicago Law Review.

Legal career 

Cooksey served as a law clerk for Judge Jerry Edwin Smith of the United States Court of Appeals for the Fifth Circuit. He then worked as a litigation associate at Gibson, Dunn & Crutcher in Washington, D.C. where his practice focused on appeals and constitutional law. He later served as Deputy Chief Counsel for Senator Ted Cruz of Texas. He then served as General Counsel to Senator Josh Hawley of Missouri. He advised the Senator on issues including constitutional law, judicial nominations, election law, federal criminal law, and ethics compliance, and served as the Senator's lead staffer on the U.S. Senate Committee on the Judiciary.

Appointment to the Federal Election Commission 

On October 28, 2020, President Donald Trump announced his intent to nominate Cooksey to serve as a Commissioner of the Federal Election Commission. On October 30, 2020, his nomination was sent to the Senate. He was nominated to the vacancy created by the retirement of Lee E. Goodman on February 16, 2018. On December 9, 2020, he was confirmed by the Senate by a vote of 50–46. He was sworn in on December 14, 2020, making him the youngest commissioner in FEC history.

Personal life 

Cooksey is a Republican.

References 

Living people
Year of birth missing (living people)
21st-century American lawyers
Members of the Federal Election Commission
Missouri lawyers
Missouri Republicans
People associated with Gibson Dunn
Truman State University alumni
University of Chicago Law School alumni
United States Senate lawyers